Alain Ducasse at The Dorchester is a restaurant located in The Dorchester, Park Lane, London. It is one of over 25 restaurants operated by French-born chef Alain Ducasse. The Executive Chef is Jean-Philippe Blondet, who followed on for Chef Jocelyn Herland. Opened in November 2007, it was awarded three Michelin stars in 2010 and has retained them every year since.

Description
At the time of opening, Alain Ducasse at The Dorchester was intended to have "the modernity of Beige in Tokyo, the seriousness of Le Plaza Athénée in Paris and the flavours of Le Louis XV in Monaco."

The Executive Chef was originally intended to be Nicola Canuti, but Canuti was replaced before opening by Jocelyn Herland. Designed by Patrick Jouin and his partner Sanjit Manku, the restaurant is inspired by British traditions. The tables feature ceramic vegetables as centrepieces, handmade butter dishes in pink marble, and Porthault linen tablecloths.

Menu
The restaurant serves contemporary French cuisine using seasonal French and British ingredients.

Reception

Mark Palmer visited the restaurant shortly after opening for The Daily Telegraph. The food critic went into the restaurant with high expectations, describing Alain Ducasse opening a London-based restaurant as the moment when "God comes to town".  An overall rating of eight out of 10 was given.

Terry Durack of The Independent wrote that some of the dishes on offer at the opening were unbalanced but admired the craftsmanship of the dishes. He said that it wasn't the best Ducasse restaurant he had been to, but gave it 16 out of 20, indicating that it was "capable of greatness". Food critic Jay Rayner reviewed Ducasse at the Dorchester for The Guardian, wrote that it was disappointing overall given Ducasse's history.

Matthew Norman reviewed the restaurant for The Guardian after it received its third Michelin star. While he praised the attentive staff, and the quality of the food, he directly compared it to several two-star restaurants he had previously reviewed and had trouble identifying the difference between the general quality of two star and three-star restaurants. He suggested that he may be due to the impact of Alain Ducasse himself. Food critics from Time Out reviewed the restaurant's express lunch menu in 2011, giving it four out of five stars.

In 2009, the restaurant appeared in the Michelin guide for the first time, appearing directly with two stars, and was named a Michelin rising star. The following year, this was increased to three Michelin stars; the restaurant becoming only the fourth UK-based three-Michelin star restaurant following The Waterside Inn, The Fat Duck and Restaurant Gordon Ramsay. As of 2017 it is one of five UK-based three-Michelin starred restaurants in the 2018 Michelin Guide published in October 2017.

See also
 List of French restaurants

References

External links

 

French restaurants in London
Restaurants established in 2007
Michelin Guide starred restaurants in the United Kingdom
British companies established in 2007